Balestier is a sub zone located in the planning area of Novena in the Central Region of Singapore. The main road, Balestier Road, links Thomson Road to Serangoon Road and the road continues on as Lavender Street. The area is home to rows of shophouses, such as the Sim Kwong Ho shophouses, the Balestier Art Deco shophouses, 412-418 Balestier Road, and 601-639 Balestier Road, low-rise apartments and commercial buildings as well as a shopping mall known as Shaw Plaza. However, Shaw Plaza has since closed down and is under construction. Balestier also has another mall, Zhongshan Mall. There are several lighting and electrical shops along Balestier Road, which is also home to the Ceylon Sports Club and the Indian Association. The area is known for its food such as bak kut teh and chicken rice. In the area, there are several apartments, condominiums, and budget hotels.

Etymology and history

The precinct was named after Joseph Balestier, the then colony's first American consul from 1837 to 1852 and the owner of a  sugar plantation called Balestier Plain, which failed and was put up for sale. Balestier was in Singapore between 1834 and 1852 and was a botanist and agriculturist. The area was named after him as it was where his plantation was located. As new settlers populated Balestier Road from the late 19th century, they established villages and grew crops such as taro. 

Balestier hired a number of immigrants on his estates. Chinese and Indian workers laboured these crops. When Balestier left Singapore due to a health breakdown after the deaths of his son and wife in 1844 and 1847, he sold his plantation to Singapore authorities and the land was leased out to Chinese farmers. Another portion was turned into a burial site for paupers and lepers. During the 19th century, many prisoners from India were sent to Singapore, where they were employed as labourers and builders. After serving their term, many of these convicts remained in Singapore as traders, artisans or skilled craftsmen. With a large diversity of people, different skills, culture, technics and practices were shared and exchange within Balestier. 

The rows of shophouses were constructed in the late 19th century have been since conserved, though some have made way for new development. These shophouses were to provide services to residents. In the 1880s, several bungalows were constructed, with one still remaining at Tai Gin Road known as the Sun Yat Sen Nanyang Memorial Hall (formerly the Sun Yat Sen Villa or Wan Qing Yuan). Overtime, with the renewing of the past historical facts of China, the 1911 Chinese revolution and its leader Sun were incorporated with the story of Singapore's independence.

Other than shophouses and bungalows, there were industrial activities in the area as well. There were rattan plantations along the Whampoa River and sugarcane productions at Jalan Ampas. 

The Hokkiens referred to Balestier Road as o kio, meaning "black bridge", and as Goh Chor Tua Pek Kong Temple (梧槽大伯公庙), meaning "Rochor Tua Pek Kong Temple". The Tamils named the area thaneer kampong தண்ணீர் கம்பம் as water was drawn from there by bullock cart in the old days.

For instance, the nickname “Recreation Road” is made popular with the growth of many sporting and recreational buildings within the vicinity in 1920s. Other examples of names given in view of activities included the Cantonese names such as Wu-hap Thong was given to the Taro pond, which is to depict the semi aquatic crops grown within the neighbourhood. The area that surrounds Balestier and Serangoon road also adopts the Malay language name of “Pauper House”, to acknowledge the presence of Tan Tock Seng pauper's Hospital to provide treatment for the under-privileged. Many more streets took on Malay names in acknowledgement to the existence of Malay kampong villages within the area.

Both the Singapore Improvement Trust and the Housing and Development Board built flats in the area known as St. Michael's Estate. Modern shophouses were erected in the 1960s as well including walk-up apartments. In the late 20th century, several buildings made way for newer buildings such as high-rise condominiums, shopping malls and new commercial buildings.

The Sultan of Sulu used to own a house along Balestier Road purchased in 1903.

Places of Worship 
The Chinese labourers, who settled in the area, built a temple in 1847 which still exists known as Goh Chor Tua Pek Kong Temple (梧槽大伯公廟), with the area having one of the last free-standing wayang stage in Singapore that was built in 1906 by Tan Boo Liat, a wealthy Hokkien Peranakan philanthropist and community leader.

Apart from the century-old Goh Chor Tua Pek Kong Temple (梧槽大伯公廟), Balestier area also consisted of various prominent temples including Balestier Kwan Im Tng Temple (坤德觀音堂), Chan Chor Min Tong (陳佐勉堂), Tai Pei Yuen Temple (大悲院) along Jalan Kemaman and Burmese Buddhist Temple at Tai Gin Road. Thong Teck Sian Tong Lian Sin Sia Temple (同德善堂念心社), a Teochew charitable temple whose mission is the practice of compassion through the provision of free medical consultation, funeral services, and assistance to the poor and needy. The temple is also known for its tradition of setting up water and tea kiosks for thirsty passers-by at the junction of Boon Teck Road and Balestier Road since 1950s.

Notable landmarks

Malay Film Productions 

In the 1940s, a film studio, Singapore Film Studios, was set up by Shaw Brothers to produce Malay films in Singapore for their local clients. The studio was later renamed as Malay Film Productions and had played a significant role in the film industry and produced hundreds of film. During World War II, this place was utilized by the Japanese to broadcast propaganda films. It was later reopened after the war in 1947, but was eventually closed in 1967 due to the falling demand for Malay language films. This place is considered one of the most iconic places in Singapore in the early days as a form of local entertainment.

Shaw Plaza 
Until the early 1980s, this site was located by the old Ruby Theatre, the first movie theatre in the area that opened in 1958 that showed mainly Chinese films. In the past, many would travel to area for movies and food carts would be present to provide some street food for the movie goers. The Shaw Towers' twin height used to sit two cinemas, the President and Hoover theaters. Hoover Theatre is a favourite for fans of the Shaw Brothers’ gong-fu films during the sixties and seventies that was opened in 1960. In 1973, President Theatre was built too. However, in 1996, both Hoover and President Theatre were demolished to make way for the Shaw Plaza that is a mixed development consisting of restaurant, departmental stall and residential apartment.

Art deco shophouses 
Shophouses in Singapore are constructed beginning in the nineteenth century by Chinese and other communities. There is the use of brick “party walls”. A further characteristic of this urban form was the width of the shophouses were generally determined by the distance it could span due to the use of timber beams between brick party walls.

Unadorned shophouses went from simple looking to elaborate and sophisticated structures. A rapid spread of classical architecture began during the Industrial Revolution. There are the Early Shophouse style, First transitional style, late shophouse style, second transitional style, Art Deco style, and Modern shophouse style. Unlike the traditional or 2nd transitional shophouses style which have abundance ornamentation, art deco evolves from it into a new style of architecture. The primary stylistic features of an art deco shophouse are the vertical emphasis and concrete as a common material in construction to achieve smooth surfaces.

The shophouse's internal spatial layout is consistent despite the change in style during the 19th century.

Balestier Market 
The Balestier Market (now Balestier Market and Food Centre) was where locals could sell their produce. It was used as a food rationing centre during World War II. Later, the market was rebuilt and housed a hawker centre as well. The market has since undergone upgrading works in the 2000s. Developers went on to construct landed properties in the 1920s with bungalows and terrace housees. 

Balestier Market, also commonly known as Or Kio ('Black Bridge' in Hokkien) due to its similarity to a dark timber bridge spanning across Sungei Whampoa, is located in the centre of Balestier Road. It was constructed in the early 1920s to provide local vendors and hawkers with an allocated space to sell their harvested crops and cooked food. In 1924, before the start of major developments in Balestier Road, the open market was known to be a bustling site despite being located a distance from other more prominent landmarks and streets. Later, rows of small huts with a pitched zinc roof were added in 1925 to shelter users from the frequent rain and the sun. The market then served as a food ration distribution centre, in the mid 1940s during World War 2. Balestier Market is now the only 'rural' market conserved and in operation in Singapore.

The government obtained Balestier's estate and leased a portion of it to Chinese farmers while another segment was turned into a burial area for patients from Tan Tock Seng Hospital. Due to the good condition of the soil and a proper irrigation system left over from the previous plantation, the new residents who moved into Balestier were able to establish their villages and new plantations such as taro, lime, and sugarcane. As Balestier became more reputable, tradesmen and merchants started to emerge, operating shophouses and selling their wares along the main road, turning Balestier Road into one of the busiest streets in Singapore.

The rise in hawkers present on Balestier Road resulted in the sidewalks constructed for pedestrians being transformed into a makeshift market selling vegetables, fruits, cooked food, and beverages. The hawkers and their customers spilled over onto the main road and created traffic obstructions, which caused motorists to drive on the opposite side of the road and increased the likelihood of accidents occurring. Residents even claimed that the hawkers were hostile when motorists asked them to shift their stalls.

Hence, many residents wrote to the authorities regarding the legalization of hawkers and related road safety concerns. These issues not only occurred in Balestier but also in other parts of Singapore. In response, the government designated marketplaces for hawkers to alleviate the road issues and to facilitate the legalization of hawkers. Balestier Market is one of the first few wet markets in Singapore which was established as the result of this government measure. However, even with such measures, police officers were still needed to patrol the area and ensure that hawkers who possessed a hawker license do not sell their products out of their allocated area.

One highly publicized example of this problem occurred in Balestier Market and arose due to the unavailability of pork in the market – three pork vendors possessing hawker licenses elsewhere were arrested and fined for illegally selling their products outside the market premises. In effect, the establishment of Balestier Market did not completely eradicate the traffic complaints from residents as there were still makeshift stalls along the road outside the market. Furthermore, residents wrote to the newspapers, expressing their difficulty in obtaining pork from the market and requesting the government to take action. Therefore, despite having an allocated space for hawkers to sell their products, Balestier Market failed to gain popularity amongst residents.

Whampoa Wet Market and Hawker Centre also known as the Tua Pah Sat (big market in Hokkien), located a few streets away from Balestier Market was constructed in the 1980s to provide food for the rising population of Whampoa and to replace Raymond Market located at Jalan Tenteram. As the new market supplied both raw produce and cooked food, it became more popular among the residents in both Balestier and Whampoa. Moreover, the new market operated both during the day and at night, with an allocated car park – making the market highly accessible for both drivers and residents.

In 1999, even after Balestier Market underwent a renovation, it ultimately still failed to compete with her "neighboring brother" because, during that period, most of the residential developments were situated around Whampoa Market. Meanwhile, Balestier was still in the phase of redevelopment into a commercial, industrial and private residential district, resulting in existing residents relocating elsewhere. Furthermore, after the upgrading, a handful of vendors decided to relocate or to discontinue their business resulting in patrons from Balestier Market shifting over to Whampoa Market instead. Consequently, the business of remaining hawkers in Balestier Market continued to deteriorate, causing many stall owners who had been serving for decades to cease their operation entirely when the market closed for redevelopment in 2004. Due to its historical and cultural significance, Balestier Market was placed under the Conservational Act by the Urban Redevelopment Authority and subsequently, plans were made by the authority to further modernize the market. After the closure, Balestier Market was bought over by Banquet Holdings Pte Ltd and was then opened in June 2008 after the latest renovation which converted the market into a food center. This is likely because operating as a wet market would not be economically viable, especially with the competition from the neighboring big markets.

Today, Balestier Market is home to many stallholders who were from markets which were either demolished, undergoing renovation or relocated. Many of these stallholders were from Upper Thomson's Long House and Lavender Food Square. Similarly to Balestier Market's resilience through the evolution of the Balestier area, these hawkers try their best to maintain their business operations despite the changing needs of society that diminish the need for hawkers and the service they provide. By providing a space for these valuable hawkers, Balestier Market is able to preserve the hawker heritage while preventing itself from becoming obsolete. Balestier Market also provides a home for two lion statues previously from the Oasis Restaurant next to the former National Stadium, both of which were demolished in 2010 – a further example of how Balestier Market serve as a repository of cultural elements.

Architectural features and issues

The most iconic feature of Balestier Market is its rows of pitched zinc roof which were later installed with lighting elements to make the roof structure prominent even at night. However, in the past, the roof design was built to shelter the wet market without considering its possibility to be converted into a food centre. After the transformation from a wet market into a food centre, the ceiling is too low to adequately contain the exhaust pipes which radiate heat throughout the interior of the place. Furthermore, as the roof is made of zinc, it conducts heat when it is exposed to direct sunlight, making it uncomfortable for customers to eat within the space, especially in the afternoon.

The only way to access the front entrance into Balestier Market is through the flight of stairs beside the main signage. The elevation of the market is a measure to deter flooding due to high surface runoff and typology of the site which occurred quite frequently in the past. A disadvantage of this feature is that the stairs cause difficulties for patrons in entering the market, as a majority of such patrons are from the older generation.

Publicity of Balestier Market
Many of these architectural issues are left unresolved to retain the structural integrity and original ambience of the market. There are a handful of heritage trails and guides that introduce users to the market, promoting the last and only rural market of Singapore, in light of its historical and cultural significance.

From a humble wet market for farmers to a food ration distribution centre and finally to a food centre selling local cuisine and delights, Balestier Market is one of the few markets that have survived through the rapid transformation of Singapore. Its value and identity as an example of vernacular infrastructural design, preserved for the newer generations as an educational tool to illustrate the phenomenon of wet markets and hawker centres in the past.

Timeline of events in Balestier Market and surroundings
 1830s – Establishment of Balestier Plantation by Joseph Balestier 
 1849 – Balestier and his family leased a large plantation outside town
 The early 1890s – Establishment of Taro, lime and sugar cane plantations
 The 1920s – Balestier Market was constructed for the residents to sell their produce
 1925 – Rows of small huts with pitched zinc roof was then added to the market
 1942 – Balestier Market turned into food ration distribution centre during World War II
 1958 – The landscape of Balestier was changed into mixed tree cultivation, coconut plantation, and grassland. Sungei Whampoa had already been canalised
 1967 – Great changes in the landscape of Whampoa. Low dilapidated houses were pulled down, mainly high-rise housings were constructed
 1950s–1970s – public housing was developed by Singapore Improvement Trust and the Housing and Development Board in the Balestier area at St Michael's Estate
 1971 – Balestier Estate was built
 The 1980s – Demolition of Raymond market and construction of Whampoa Market
 1999- Renovated.
 2004 – Many stallholders decided to retire when the market closed in 2004. Balestier Market bought over by Banquet Holdings. Underwent major development work and was converted into a food centre.

References

External links
 Balestier : A Heritage Trail by the Central Singapore Community Development Council. PDF guide here.

Novena, Singapore
Kallang
Roads in Singapore
Protected areas of Singapore